The  is a toll road in Tochigi Prefecture, Japan. It is signed E81 under the "2016 Proposal for Realization of Expressway Numbering."

Route description
The road is the main access route for the city of Nikkō, a popular getaway for tourists in the northern part of Tochigi Prefecture. It connects directly to the Tōhoku Expressway which leads to the greater Tokyo area and points to the north in the Tōhoku region. The road is officially designated as a bypass for National Route 119 (Utsunomiya Interchange to Nikkō Interchange) and National Route 120 (Nikkō Interchange to Kiyotaki Interchange). The design standard of the road is similar to most national expressways in Japan. The road has four lanes on the section designated as National Route 119 with a speed limit of 80 km/h, and two lanes on the section designated as National Route 120 with a speed limit of 60 km/h.

History
The first section of the road was opened to traffic in 1976 and the entire route was completed in 1981. It was originally built and managed by Japan Highway Public Corporation, however ownership was transferred to Tochigi Prefecture Road Public Corporation in 2005. Electronic Toll Collection (ETC) was implemented at toll stations following the transfer, and discounted fares were introduced for off-season (December to April) and off-peak (17:00-09:00) travel.

List of interchanges and features
The route lies entirely within Tochigi Prefecture.

See also

References

External links

 Tochigi Prefecture Road Public Corporation

Toll roads in Japan
Roads in Tochigi Prefecture
1976 establishments in Japan